Rita Blanca National Grassland is a National Grassland on the Great Plains near the community of Texline in northwest Dallam County, Texas, in the Texas Panhandle, and in southern Cimarron County, Oklahoma, in the western Oklahoma Panhandle. The principal city in the area is Dalhart, Texas, which houses the XIT Museum.

The name Rita Blanca (Little White River) was applied to a stream by Spanish sheepherders in the 19th Century. It was later used by the XIT ranch and has been applied to other geographic features in the vicinity.

History
Both Rita Blanca National Grassland and Kiowa National Grassland (KNG), farther west in New Mexico, are the result of the Dust Bowl of the 1930s. The Dust Bowl experience had shown the U.S. Government that climatic challenges made total conversion of the Great Plains to agriculture not only infeasible but undesirable. In 1960, Congress approved the creation of KNG and RBNG.

General description
It is not a solid block of protected land, but rather several small blocks of U.S. Forest Service-owned native prairie grasslands, interspersed with privately owned property. The area is classed as semi-arid, and serves as habitat for pronghorn, rabbits, prairie dogs, coyotes and predatory birds.. Vegetation is primarily shortgrass. The greater part,  is in Texas, and the balance  is in Oklahoma.

Rita Blanca National Grassland is administered by Cibola National Forest, along with the Great Plains Black Kettle National Grassland, Kiowa National Grassland, and McClellan Creek National Grassland, and forest ranger districts in New Mexico. The Cibola National Forest headquarters are located in Albuquerque, New Mexico. There are local ranger district offices located in Clayton, New Mexico.

Ecology
A team led by Donald L. Hazlett studied the history and ecology of the Kiowa and Rita Blanca Natural Grasslands, and reported its findings to the U.S. Department of Agriculture, Forest Service in 2009. The RBNG has a very complex natural ecosystem, with a wide variety of flora and fauna. They found, for example, 826 different species of vascular plants, representing 81 different families.

Gallery

See also
 List of protected grasslands of North America
 Grasslands of the Great Plains (U.S.)
 Native grasses of the Great Plains region

References

External links

Kiowa and Rita Blanca National Grasslands

National Grasslands of the United States
Grasslands of the North American Great Plains
Cibola National Forest
Protected areas of Cimarron County, Oklahoma
Protected areas of Dallam County, Texas
Grasslands of Oklahoma
1960 establishments in Oklahoma
1960 establishments in Texas
Protected areas established in 1960